Methodios II (Greek: Μεθόδιος Β΄) (? – 1240) served as Ecumenical Patriarch of Constantinople (in exile due to the Fourth Crusade) for three months in 1240, when he died. He succeeded Germanus II.

Before he was elected Patriarch, he was abbot of the Hyacinth Monastery in Nicaea. His short patriarchy did not let him make important contributions.

Sources 
 Οικουμενικό Πατριαρχείο
 «Νεώτερον Εγκυκλοπαιδικόν Λεξικόν Ηλίου» vol. 13, p. 172

1240 deaths
13th-century patriarchs of Constantinople
People of the Empire of Nicaea